Sara Montes (born 7 June 1926) is a Mexican film and television actress.

Selected filmography
 The Tiger of Jalisco (1947)
 Los tres García (1947)
 Angels of the Arrabal (1949)
 Cuatro contra el mundo (1950)
 Nosotras las taquígrafas (1950)
 Los enredos de una gallega (1951)
 Canasta uruguaya (1951)
 The Life of Agustín Lara (1959)

References

Bibliography 
 Rogelio Agrasánchez. Guillermo Calles: A Biography of the Actor and Mexican Cinema Pioneer. McFarland, 2010.

External links 
 

1926 births
Possibly living people
Mexican film actresses
Mexican television actresses
Actresses from Michoacán
People from Morelia